The Biela Valley Trolleybus ( or Bielathalbahn) was a trolleybus service in the German state of Saxony. The facility opened on 10 July 1901 and had closed again by September 1904. It was one of the first trolleybus operations in the world. The 4.4-kilometre route was also known at the time as the Gleislose Bahn or "trackless railway" – its full name being Gleislose Bielathal-Motorbahn mit elektrischer Oberleitung ("Trackless Biela Valley Motor Line with Electric Overhead Cable"). It was operated by the firm of Bielathal-Motorbahn Königstein and served the lower valley of the Biela in Saxon Switzerland. The route linked Königstein on the Elbe with the then-independent village of Hütten. The terminus was at Kurbad Königsbrunn.

See also 

 List of trolleybus systems in Germany

Notes

Further reading
 Frank Dittmann: Die gleislose Bielatalbahn. In: Sächsische Heimatblätter. Issue 3, 1991, pp. 177–180.
 Rudolf Hajny: Erster Oberleitungsbus rumpelte durch das Bielatal. Sächsische Zeitung (Ausgabe Pirna), 11 July 2001.
 Norbert Kaiser: Mit der Hüttener Rumpelkiste gleislos durch das Bielatal. Zur Geschichte der O-Bus-Linie Königstein - Hütten - Bad Königsbrunn. In: Petra Binder (Hrsg.): Auf Straßen, Schienen und Wegen. Landkalenderbuch 2011 für die Sächsische Schweiz und das Osterzgebirge. Schütze-Engler-Weber-Verlag, Dresden 2010, pp. 118–122.
 
 Guarini, Emil: Electric Trolley Vehicles Without Rails. In: The Engineering Magazine. An Industrial Review. Vol 26. New York 1904. pp. 33–48.

External links 
 Photo of car no. 2 turning in Königstein

Trolleybus transport in Germany
Sächsische Schweiz-Osterzgebirge
Transport in Saxon Switzerland